The compound of five octahedra is one of the five regular polyhedron compounds. This polyhedron can be seen as either a polyhedral stellation or a compound. This compound was first described by Edmund Hess in 1876. It is unique among the regular compounds for not having a regular convex hull.

As a stellation 

It is the second stellation of the icosahedron, and given as Wenninger model index 23.

It can be constructed by a rhombic triacontahedron with rhombic-based pyramids added to all the faces, as shown by the five colored model image. (This construction does not generate the regular compound of five octahedra, but shares the same topology and can be smoothly deformed into the regular compound.)

It has a density of greater than 1.

As a compound 
It can also be seen as a polyhedral compound of five octahedra arranged in icosahedral symmetry (Ih).

The spherical and stereographic projections of this compound look the same as those of the disdyakis triacontahedron.
But the convex solid's vertices on 3- and 5-fold symmetry axes (gray in the images below) correspond only to edge crossings in the compound.

Replacing the octahedra by tetrahemihexahedra leads to the compound of five tetrahemihexahedra.

Other 5-octahedra compounds 
A second 5-octahedra compound, with octahedral symmetry, also exists. It can be generated by adding a fifth octahedra to the standard 4-octahedra compound.

See also
Compound of three octahedra
Compound of four octahedra
Compound of ten octahedra
Compound of twenty octahedra

References

 Peter R. Cromwell, Polyhedra, Cambridge, 1997.
 
 (1st Edn University of Toronto (1938))
 H.S.M. Coxeter, Regular Polytopes, (3rd edition, 1973), Dover edition, 3.6 The five regular compounds, pp.47-50, 6.2 Stellating the Platonic solids, pp.96-104
 E. Hess 1876 Zugleich Gleicheckigen und Gleichflächigen Polyeder, Schriften der Gesellschaft zur Berörderung der Gasammten Naturwissenschaften zu Marburg 11 (1876) pp 5–97.

External links 
 MathWorld: Octahedron5-Compound
 Paper Model Compound of Five Octahedra
 VRML model: 
 

Polyhedral stellation
Polyhedral compounds